"Location" is a song recorded by British rapper Dave featuring Nigerian singer Burna Boy, released as the third single from Dave's debut studio album Psychodrama. The song was written by Dave, Burna Boy and Jonathan Mensah, and produced by Fraser T. Smith, Jae5 and Dave.

Commercially, the song reached the top 10 in the United Kingdom and top 40 in Ireland. In April 2020, it was certified as Triple Platinum by the British Phonographic Industry for exceeding chart sales of 1,800,000.

Music video
The music video for "Location" was released via YouTube on 15 July 2019. Directed by Kaylum and Dave, it was shot on location in Ibiza, and features behind the scenes shots of Stormzy's #MERKY Festival, held at Ibiza Rocks, which Dave co-headlined alongside Stormzy and Fredo.

Burna Boy appears in the video, alongside a number of cameo appearances from other artists and celebrities, including Stormzy, Fredo, Lethal Bizzle, Jorja Smith, Avelino, J Hus, Aitch, Unknown T, comedian Michael Dapaah and English footballers, Raheem Sterling and Jadon Sancho.

Critical reception
Writing for Complex, Natty Kasambla referred to the track as "an understated bop".

Charts

Weekly charts

Year-end charts

Certifications

References

2019 singles
2019 songs
Dave (rapper) songs
Burna Boy songs
Song recordings produced by Fraser T. Smith
Songs written by Dave (rapper)
Songs written by Burna Boy